Bimal Krishna Matilal (1 June 1935 – 8 June 1991) was an eminent British-Indian philosopher whose writings presented the Indian philosophical tradition as a comprehensive system of logic incorporating most issues addressed by themes in Western philosophy. From 1977 to 1991, he was the Spalding Professor of Eastern Religion and Ethics at the University of Oxford.

Education
Literate in Sanskrit from an early age, Matilal was also drawn towards Mathematics and Logic. He was trained in the traditional Indian philosophical system by leading scholars of the Sanskrit College, where he himself was a teacher from 1957 to 1962. He was taught by scholars like pandit Taranath Tarkatirtha and Kalipada Tarkacharya. He also interacted with pandit Ananta Kumar Nyayatarkatirtha, Madhusudan Nyayacharya and Visvabandhu Tarkatirtha. The upadhi (degree) of Tarkatirtha (master of Logic) was awarded to him in 1962.

While teaching at the Sanskrit College (an affiliated college of the University of Calcutta) between 1957 and 1962, Matilal came in contact with Daniel Ingalls, an Indologist at Harvard University, who encouraged him to join the PhD program there. Matilal secured a Fulbright fellowship and completed his PhD under Ingalls on the Navya-Nyāya doctrine of negation, between 1962 and 1965. During this period he also studied with Willard Van Orman Quine. Subsequently, he was professor of Sanskrit at the University of Toronto, and in 1977 he was elected Spalding Professor at Oxford, succeeding Sarvepalli Radhakrishnan and Robert Charles Zaehner.

Death
Matilal died of cancer on 8 June 1991.

Awards
 Padma Bhushan 1990

Works by Matilal
In his work, he presented Indian logic, particularly Nyāya-Vaiśeṣika, Mīmāṃsā and Buddhist philosophy, as being relevant in modern philosophical discourse. Matilal presented Indian Philosophical thought more as a synthesis rather than a mere exposition. This helped create a vibrant revival of interest in Indian philosophical tradition as a relevant source of ideas rather than a dead discipline.

He was also the founding editor of the Journal of Indian Philosophy.

Books

Logical and Ethical Issues: An essay on the Indian Philosophy of Religion, Calcutta University 1982 (repr. Chronicle Books, Delhi 2004)
Navya Nyâya Doctrine of Negation, Harvard Oriental Series 46, 1968

Niti, Yukti o Dharma, (in Bengali), Ananda Publishers Calcutta 1988.

See also the entries in Worldcat.

See also
 Indian logic
 Śākaṭāyana (Matilal discusses the claim that all nominals are ultimately derived from verbal roots)
 Nyāya Sūtras

References

Further reading
 Heeraman Tiwari, Introduction to the Logical and Ethical Issues: An essay on the Indian Philosophy of Religion, University of Calcutta 1982.
 J.N. Mohanty, Introduction to Relativism, Suffering and Beyond: Essays in Memory of Bimal K. Matilal, Edited by J N Mohanty and Purushottama Bilimoria,  Oxford University Press 1997. 
 Daniel Ingalls, In Memoriam Bimal Krishna Matilal, Journal of Indian Philosophy 1991

External links

A conference honouring Matilal was organized in Jadavpur University in January 2007.

1935 births
1991 deaths
Indian Sanskrit scholars
Sanskrit grammarians
University of Calcutta alumni
Harvard University alumni
Academic staff of the University of Calcutta
Indian logicians
Epistemologists
Spalding Professors of Eastern Religion and Ethics
Recipients of the Padma Bhushan in literature & education
Indian writers
Indian male writers
Indian non-fiction writers
Indian male non-fiction writers
Indian educators
Educationists from India
Indian editors
Indian magazine editors
20th-century Indian non-fiction writers
20th-century Indian writers
20th-century Indian male writers
20th-century Indian philosophers
20th-century Indian educators
20th-century Indian scholars
People from Jaynagar Majilpur
People from South 24 Parganas district
West Bengal academics
Scholars from West Bengal
Indian emigrants to the United Kingdom
British Sanskrit scholars
British logicians
20th-century British philosophers